Sergei Yuryevich Toporov (born 2 January 1971) is a Russian professional football coach and a former player.

Club career
He played 8 seasons in the Russian Football National League for FC Zarya Leninsk-Kuznetsky, FC Irtysh Omsk and FC Gazovik-Gazprom Izhevsk.

Honours
 Russian Second Division Zone 6 top scorer: 1992 (22 goals).

External links
 

1971 births
Living people
People from Prokopyevsk
Soviet footballers
Russian footballers
FC Irtysh Omsk players
FC Tobol Kurgan players
Association football forwards
Association football midfielders
Sportspeople from Kemerovo Oblast